Naïs is a genus of fungi in the family Halosphaeriaceae. The genus, which contains two species, was circumscribed by mycologist Jan Kohlmeyer in 1962 to contain Naïs inornata. N. aquatica was described from submerged wood collected in north Queensland, Australia in 1992.

References

Aquatic fungi
Microascales